Anti-Korean sentiment in Japan refers to opposition, hostility, hatred, distrust, fear, and general dislike of Korean people or culture in Japan. Historically, relations between Japan and Korea have been poor. Much of the current anti-Korean sentiment stems from far-right groups.

Pre-WWII History 

Relations date ancient Japan and Korea date back to at least the 4th century, according to historical records of ancient China, Japan, and Korea. According to the Book of Sui, Silla and Baekje greatly valued relations with the Kofun-period Wa and the Korean kingdoms made diplomatic efforts to maintain their good standing with the Japanese. The Samguk sagi (Chronicles of the Three Kingdoms) reported that Baekje and Silla sent their princes as hostages to the Yamato court in exchange for military support to continue their military campaigns; King Asin of Baekje sent his son (Jeonji) in 397, and King Silseong of Silla sent his son Misaheun in 402. Hogong, from Japan, helped to found Silla. According to the Nihon Shoki, Silla was invaded by an army from Wa (Japan) in the third century. In Korea, inscriptions on the Gwanggaeto Stele state that the king of Goguryeo assisted Silla when it was invaded by the Wa, and punished Baekje for allying with the Wa. The stela also records Wa excursions in the early 5th century.

In 1592, Japanese samurai armies invaded Korea on the orders of Toyotomi Hideyoshi. The Imjin Wars continued until 1598, when the Japanese left, and took with them a number of Korea craftsmen.  During the Joseon Dynasty, Wokou pirate raids on Korean soil were frequent, which would eventually form the basis of hatred between the two sides. Such tensions built up further after the Japanese annexation of Korea in 1910. Japan maintained control of Korea until the end of World War II in 1945.

During the 1923 Great Kantō earthquake, widespread damage occurred in a region with a significant Korean population, and much of the local Japanese overreacted to rumors which spread after the earthquake. All people who failed the test were killed, which caused many ethnic Chinese , also unable to correctly pronounce the shibboleth, to be indiscriminately killed in large numbers.

Post-WWII history 
On April 2014, several anti-Korean stickers were found posted at 13 locations along the Shikoku Pilgrimage route; the stickers were denounced by a spokesman from the Shikoku 88 Temple Pilgrimage Association.

North Korea 
There is also much concern in Japan regarding North Korea and its nuclear and long-range missile capabilities, as a result of missile tests in 1993, 1998 and 2006 and an underground nuclear test in 2006. There are also controversies regarding North Korean abductions of Japanese, where Japanese citizens were abducted by North Korean agents during the 1970s and 1980s.

South Korea 
Much of the anti-Korean sentiment present today however deals with contemporary attitudes. During the 2002 FIFA World Cup, Japanese and Korean supporters clashed with one another. Both sides were also known to post racist messages against each other on online bulletins. There were also disputes regarding how the event was to be hosted, as a result of the rivalry between the two nations.

The Korean Wave, or the exportation of South Korean pop culture, has created some negative feelings among pockets of Japanese society. Many Japanese citizens with conservative views and some right-wing nationalist groups have organized anti-Korean Wave demonstrations via 2channel. On 9 August 2011, more than 2,000 protesters demonstrated in front of Fuji TV's headquarters in Odaiba, Tokyo against the broadcasting of Korean dramas. Earlier, in July 2011, well-known actor Sousuke Takaoka was fired from his agency, Stardust Promotion, for tweeting criticisms against the influx of Korean dramas. The general perception of Koreans on 2channel is negative, with users depicting them as a violent, unethical, and irrational people who are a 'threat' to Japan. Users often reference stereotypes of Koreans, such as the use of dogs in Korean cuisine.

Hate of South Korean 
In Japanese bookstores, Kenkan (嫌韓, "Hate of [South] Korean") books are placed separately, and Kenkan is recognized as a book genre. On the other hand, there are no Hyomil (혐일 or 嫌日, "Hate of Japanese") books in South Korean bookstores. South Korean media point out that Japan's "Hate of [South] Korean" cannot be identified with South Korea's "anti-Japan" (반일). In South Korea, "anti-Japan" (반일) are distinguished from "Hate of Japanese" (혐일). ("Anti-Japan" ostracizes Japan in an anti-imperialistic and non-ethnic context, and "Hate of Japanese" ostracizes Japan in all contexts, including race/ethnic. However, in Japan, there is no distinction between "anti-Korea" and "Hate of South Korean".) There is 'Kenkan' racist hate groups (ex. Zaitokukai and other Uyoku dantai) in Japan, but there is no 'Hyomil' racist hate groups in South Korea. 

Manga Kenkanryu (often referred to as "Hating the Korean Wave Manga") by Sharin Yamano discusses these issues while making many other arguments and claims against Korea.

Territorial dispute 

The territorial dispute over Liancourt Rocks also fuels outrage.

2019–2020 Japan–South Korea trade dispute

Historical revisionism

Comfort women issue

Except for some left-wing socialist political parties (mainly Social Democratic Party and Japanese Communist Party), major Japanese politicians and political parties often have historical revisionist perceptions of the Comfort women issue. Fumio Kishida is calling on the German government to remove the Statue of Peace in Berlin, it has caused considerable controversy in South Korea. Even the liberal Constitutional Democratic Party of Japan, as well as the conservative Liberal Democratic Party, is calling on the South Korean government to remove the Status of Peace.

Japanese textbook revisionism

On June 26, 1982, the textbook screening process in Japan came under scrutiny when the media of Japan and its neighboring countries gave extensive coverage to changes required by the Minister of Education. Experts from the ministry sought to soften textbook references to Japanese aggression before and during World War II. The Japanese invasion of China in 1937, for example, was modified to "advance". Passages describing the fall of Nanking justified the Japanese atrocities by describing the acts as a result of Chinese provocations. Pressure from China successfully led the Ministry of Education to adopt a new authorization criterion - the "Neighboring Country Clause" (近隣諸国条項) - stating: "textbooks ought to show understanding and seek international harmony in their treatment of modern and contemporary historical events involving neighboring Asian countries."

In 2006, Japanese textbooks stated that the Liancourt Rocks is Japanese territory. This island is disputed territory claimed by both Japan and South Korea. The head of the South Korean Ministry of Education, Kim Shin-il, sent a letter of protest to Bunmei Ibuki, the Minister of Education, on May 9, 2007. In a speech marking the 88th anniversary of the March 1 Independence Movement, South Korean President Roh Moo-hyun called for Japan to correct their school textbooks on controversial topics ranging from "inhumane rape of comfort women" to "the Korean ownership of the Liancourt Rocks".

Politics 

The Hankyoreh, a centre-left/liberal newspaper in South Korea, denounced right-wing nationalism led by Shinzo Abe and Nippon Kaigi as "anti-Korean nationalism", in its English column. However, the Hankyoreh is also a media that shows a resistant nationalist tendency toward Japan. There are suspicions that Shinzo Abe provided support to anti-Korean ultra-nationalist right-wing kindergartens.

Almost all major South Korean media outlets point out that the Liberal Democratic Party and its politicians have anti-Korean sentiment, and that the party's main support base is "Hate of South Korean".

Some right-wing groups in Japan today have targeted ethnic Koreans living within Japan. One such group, known as Zaitokukai, is organized by members on the Internet, and has led street demonstrations against Korean schools.

On July 15, 2021, Hirohisa Soma (相馬弘尚), the Japanese embassy in South Korea, said in an interview with JTBC, "President Moon Jae-in is doing a masturbation".

According to Michael J. Green in January 2022, presidential candidates in the 2022 South Korean presidential election are willing to improve relations with Japan, but Japanese political leaders have analyzed that they are not.

Post-war comparisons or links to Germany 
South Korean media, academia and politicians often compare the differences in perceptions and attitudes toward antisemitism/anti-Korean racism and war crimes in Germany and Japan after World War II.

2019–2020 Japan–South Korea trade dispute was triggered by the Japanese government's exclusion of South Korea from the trade 'white list'. Germany's newspaper, Süddeutsche Zeitung criticized only the Japan's government, because the Japanese politicians and Japan's governments have never properly reflected on their historical perceptions related to Japanese war crimes in World War II. In Germany, unlike Japan, the historical revisionist view of Axis powers of World War II war crimes is socially taboo and partially restricted by law.

Comfort women negationism and Japanese war crimes denial is often compared to Holocaust denial.

See also
2channel
Anti-Chinese sentiment in Japan
Anti-Japanese sentiment in Korea
Antisemitism in Japan
DHC Corporation
History of Japan–Korea relations
Japan–Korea disputes
Nativism (politics)
Netto-uyoku
Moritomo Gakuen
Historical negationism
Historical revisionism
Racism in Japan

References

 
Anti-Korean violence
Foreign relations of Japan

Japan–Korea relations
Japan–South Korea relations
Japanese nationalism
Nippon Kaigi
Racism in Japan